Kelly Anne Betteridge (born 1969) is a British Anglican priest. Since May 2021, she has been Archdeacon of Bodmin in the Diocese of Truro.

Biography
Betteridge studied education and theology at the Roehampton Institute, and graduated with a Bachelor of Arts (BA) degree in 1992. She was a youth and children's worker, and then worked for the Church Pastoral Aid Society (CPAS), an evangelical Anglican mission agency.

Having trained for ordination at Queen's College, Birmingham, she was ordained in the Church of England as a deacon in 2010 and as a priest in 2011. She served her curacy at St Nicolas Church, Nuneaton in the Diocese of Coventry from 2010 to 2014. She was then vicar of the same church and priest-in-charge of Weddington and Caldecote. After being announced as the next Archdeacon of Bodmin in the Diocese of Truro in January 2021, she was licensed as archdeacon during a service at St Petroc's Church, Bodmin on 23 May 2021. She is additionally serving as director of intergenerational church for the Diocese.

References

1969 births
Living people
Archdeacons of Bodmin
21st-century Anglican priests
Alumni of the University of Roehampton
Alumni of the Queen's Foundation